Safari Lagoon Waterpark was a former water park in the housing area of Pandan Perdana, in  Pandan, Selangor, Malaysia, operating between 1998 and 2007.

Background
It was the first water park built on a rooftop in the Klang Valley and was touted as the biggest of its kind in Malaysia. The park featured animal sculptures and lush greenery for a safari look. The park is owned by Dirga Niaga Sdn Bhd and reportedly cost RM 28 million and its Operations Water Park Consultant was Mon S Sudesh .
The park covered 120,000 square feet and was located on the seventh floor of Pandan Safari Shopping Complex.

Closure
In January 2007, there was an incident where an employee drowned in one of the park's pools when he was trapped inside a high-pressure water pump while retrieving a visitor's items. Following that, it was revealed that the theme park had been operating for the last nine years without a license from the Ampang Jaya Municipal Council (MPAJ).

The park was closed shortly after; a part of it was later reused as a restaurant, but largely deserted by 2014. Nevertheless, the shopping complex beneath it continued to operate until 2015.

References

External links
Drone footage of the abandoned Pandan Safari Lagoon water park in 2016

1998 establishments in Malaysia
2007 disestablishments in Malaysia
Buildings and structures in Selangor
Tourist attractions in Selangor
Water parks in Malaysia